John Charles Misko (born October 1, 1954 in Highland Park, Michigan) is an American football player who played in the National Football League for the Detroit Lions and Los Angeles Rams.

References

1954 births
Living people
People from Highland Park, Michigan
Players of American football from Michigan
American football punters   
Los Angeles Rams players
Detroit Lions players
Oregon State Beavers football players
National Football League replacement players